Papanasam is a panchayat town in Thanjavur district in the Indian state of Tamil Nadu. The name literally translates to "Destruction of Sins" in the Tamil language. It is the suburban region of Kumbakonam.

Geography

Climate  
Köppen-Geiger climate classification system classifies its climate as tropical wet and dry.

Demographics

Population 
As of 2001 India census, Papanasam had a population of 16,397. Males constitute 50% of the population and females 50%. Papanasam has an average literacy rate of 76%, higher than the national average of 59.5%: male literacy is 82%, and female literacy is 70%. In Papanasam, 11% of the population is under 6 years of age.

Government and politics  
Papanasam assembly constituency is part of Mayiladuturai Lok Sabha constituency.

Culture/Cityscape 

Tourist Attractions 
There are three major temples, Pallaivanatha Swamy temple constructed by the Cholas, Srinivasa Perumal Temple and 108 Sivalayam temple.

Transport

By Air  
Nearby Airport is Tiruchirappalli (TRZ) Airport  which is 78 km distance

By Rail  
Papanasam railway station is situated between Thanjavur and Kumbakonam.

By Road  
Papanasam Bus stop is situated between Thanjavur  to  Kumbakonam route. Route Buses are available every 10 minutes. Papanasam Bus Stand is available from which people can get local buses and mini buses to villages around Papanasam.

Education

Media

Sports  
 -->

Notable people
 Papanasam Sivan, classical singer.
 Ravi Shankar, spiritual leader.
 G. K. Vasan, Former union minister, President Tamil Manila congress.
 G. K. Moopanar, Leader AICC.
 R. Doraikkannu, Agriculture Minister Tamil Nadu.
 M. Ramkumar, Former member legislative assembly, Former Chairman district panchayat.

References

Cities and towns in Thanjavur district